The Nephews of Zorro (also known as The Cousins of Zorro) is a 1968 Italian comedy film directed by Marcello Ciorciolini starring the comic duo Franco and Ciccio.

Cast 

 Franco Franchi: Franco La Vacca
 Ciccio Ingrassia: Ciccio La Vacca
 Dean Reed: Don Rafael de la Vega/Zorro
 Agata Flori: Carmencita
 Ivano Staccioli: False Capitain Martinez
 Pedro Sanchez: Sgt. Alvarez
 Mario Maranzana: Richter Ramirez
 Franco Fantasia: Don Diego de la Vega
 Enzo Andronico: Kleptomane
 Evi Farinelli: Rosita
 Riccardo Pizzuti as Lanciere

References

External links

The Nephews of Zorro at Variety Distribution

1968 films
1960s Western (genre) comedy films
Italian Western (genre) comedy films
Zorro films
Spaghetti Western films
Italian buddy comedy films
1960s buddy comedy films
Films directed by Marcello Ciorciolini
Films scored by Piero Umiliani
1960s adventure comedy films
1968 comedy films
Films based on works by Johnston McCulley
1960s Italian-language films
1960s American films
1960s Italian films